San Miguel, officially the Municipality of San Miguel (Surigaonon: Lungsod nan San Miguel), is a 1st class municipality in the province of Surigao del Sur, Philippines. According to the 2020 census, it has a population of 41,809 people.

It is also one of the only two landlocked municipalities in the province along with Tagbina.

Antique gold discoveries
In 1981, Edilberto "Berto" Morales, a farmer employed as a bulldozer operator in an irrigation project accidentally unearthed a hoard of authentic gold artifacts and jewelries weighing up to 30 kg in Barangay Magroyong which includes masks, figurines, bowls, daggers, trinkets, belts, and all sorts of body ornaments. Through a support of several historical accounts, archaeologists and historians believed that the gold items were associated between 10th to 13th century used by pre-colonial Filipinos, years before Spaniards came to the country. Some of the golden artifacts, jewelries and ornaments, dubbed as the "Surigao Treasure", were then sold to and currently exhibited at the Ayala Museum in the city of Makati, Philippines and some pieces at the Central Bank of the Philippines. Morales' discoveries were then considered one of the first proofs that gold was an important link between the early people of pre-colonial Philippines and the neighboring Southeast Asian countries.

Geography

Barangays
San Miguel is politically subdivided into 18 barangays.

Climate

Demographics

Economy

References

External links
San Miguel Profile at PhilAtlas.com
  San Miguel Profile at the DTI Cities and Municipalities Competitive Index
[ Philippine Standard Geographic Code]
Philippine Census Information
Local Governance Performance Management System

Municipalities of Surigao del Sur